Palatinate-Simmern and Zweibrücken was a state of the Holy Roman Empire based in the Simmern and Zweibrücken in modern Rhineland-Palatinate, Germany.

Palatinate-Simmern and Zweibrücken was created in 1410 out of the partition of the Palatinate after the death of King Rupert III for his son Stephen. In 1444 the County of Veldenz was added to the state but later in the year Stephen partitioned his territories between his sons Frederick (who received Simmern) and Louis (who received Zweibrücken and Veldenz). In 1448, Stephen inherited half the territories of Palatinate-Neumarkt but sold them to Palatinate-Mosbach.

Count Palatine 
 Stephen, 1410–59

1410s establishments in the Holy Roman Empire
1410 establishments in Europe
1450s disestablishments in the Holy Roman Empire
1459 disestablishments in Europe
States and territories established in 1410
House of Wittelsbach
History of the Palatinate (region)
Former states and territories of Rhineland-Palatinate